Henry or Harry Wallace may refer to:

 Henry A. Wallace (1888–1965), U.S. Vice President 1941–1945, presidential candidate for the Progressive Party 1948
 Henry A. Wallace Beltsville Agricultural Research Center
 Henry Cantwell Wallace (1866–1924), U.S. Secretary of Agriculture, father of Henry A. Wallace
 Henry Louis Wallace (born 1965), American serial killer
 Henry Wallace (American football) (born 1938), American football player
 Henry Wallace, inventor of the kinemassic field generator, an alleged anti-gravity device
 Harry Wallace (1885–1973), British politician
 Harry Brookings Wallace, former Chancellor of Washington University in St. Louis
 Harry Wallace (rugby league) (died 1917), English rugby league footballer